Piotr Stanisław Szczepanik (14 February 1942 – 20 August 2020) was a popular Polish singer and actor.

Some of his better known songs are Żółte Kalendarze ("Yellow calendars"), Kochać ("To love"), Goniąc kormorany ("Chasing cormorants"), and Nigdy więcej ("Never again").

Szczepanik was born in Lublin. From 1980 to 1989, he was involved with the Solidarity movement.

In 2008, he was awarded the Officer's Cross of the Order of Polonia Restituta.

Szczepanik died on 20 August 2020, after years of dealing with illness.

Selected discography
 1966 Piotr Szczepanik śpiewa
 1969 Największe przeboje	
 1987 P. Szczepanik, największe przeboje
 1991 P. Szczepanik & Ricercar 64

References

External links
 Piotr Szczepanik at filmpolski.pl
 

1942 births
2020 deaths
Musicians from Lublin
Officers of the Order of Polonia Restituta
Polish pop singers
20th-century Polish  male singers